This is a list of events and standings for the Professional Fighters League, a mixed martial arts organization based in the United States, for the 2018 season.

Each weight class had 12 fighters, each of which faced two rivals. The top eight fighters in each weight class qualified to the playoffs. The season concluded on December 31, 2018 with six championship bouts back-to-back with a $10 million prize pool.

2018 world champions

Events

2018 PFL Heavyweight playoffs

* Valdrin Istrefi was originally scheduled to face Philipe Lins but was forced to pull out of the bout. He was replaced by Caio Alencar.

2018 PFL Light Heavyweight playoffs

2018 PFL Middleweight playoffs

* Shamil Gamzatov was originally scheduled to face John Howard but was forced to pull out of the bout. He was replaced by Eddie Gordon.

2018 PFL Welterweight playoffs

* João Zeferino was originally scheduled to face Bojan Veličković but was forced to pull out of the bout. He was replaced by Abubakar Nurmagomedov.

* Abubakar Nurmagomedov was originally scheduled to face Magomed Magomedkerimov but was unable to continue in the tournament. He was replaced by his quarterfinal opponent, Bojan Veličković.

2018 PFL Lightweight playoffs

* Islam Mamedov was originally scheduled to face Rashid Magomedov but was unable to continue in the tournament. He was replaced by his quarterfinal opponent, Thiago Tavares.

2018 PFL Featherweight playoffs

* Timur Valiev was originally scheduled to face Alexandre Almeida but was forced to pull out of the bout. He was replaced by Jumabieke Tuerxun.

Standings
The point system consists of outcome based scoring and bonuses for an early win. Under the outcome based scoring system, the winner of a fight receives 3 points and the loser receives 0 points. If the fight ends in a draw, both fighters will receive 1 point. The bonus for winning a fight in the first, second, or third round is 3 points, 2 points, and 1 point respectively. For example, if a fighter wins a fight in the first round, then the fighter will receive 6 total points. If a fighter misses weight, then the fighter that missed weight will receive 0 points and his opponent will receive 3 points due to a walkover victory.

Featherweight

Lightweight

Although Efrain Escudero won his fight against Jason High, PFL MMA rules state a fighter who misses the weight limit forfeits all points from the match, and the opponent earns a walkover win.

Welterweight

Middleweight

Light Heavyweight

Heavyweight

♛ = Clinched playoff spot ---
🚫 = Ruled out ---
E = Eliminated

NOTE:  Prior to PFL 8, which started the PFL playoff, Valdrin Istrefi was ruled out because of an injury.  Caio Alencar was declared the first alternate and participated in the playoff.

See also
List of PFL events
List of current PFL fighters

References

2018
2018 in mixed martial arts
Mixed martial arts in New York (state)
Sports in Manhattan
2018 in sports in New York (state)
December 2018 sports events in the United States